Passiona is an Australian passionfruit-flavoured soft drink currently manufactured by Schweppes Australia and originally Cottee's.

History 
Originally developed as a cordial by Lismore dairy farmer Spencer Cottee during the 1920s to avoid wasting excess passionfruit on his farm, when carbonated Passiona became a foundation product of the Cottee's range. Passiona was first manufactured in 1924, and described in writing in an address to the Mullumbimby Chamber of Commerce by Spencer Cottee 1925. In 1926, a factory was set up in Sydney, and in 1927 the drink was marketed to the public.

Newspaper reports from the 1930s mention Australians taking the drink with them overseas to Canada and Jerusalem. In 1934, Cottees Passiona Ltd reported a gross profit of £609.

Cottee granted licences to produce the drink to a number of now defunct Australian bottlers, including Geo. Hall & Sons in South Australia and Bowral Bottlers in the NSW Southern Highlands. The trademark has also been used by Cottee's jelly crystal range.

Ingredients
The passionfruit pulp was originally supplied from not only Australian mainland growers, but later also a Norfolk Island cooperative. Cottees then established plants in New Guinea in the highlands at Goroka and Mt. Hagen.

References

External links
Passiona Jelly
Photograph of Passiona promotional display from 1952

Fruit sodas
Australian drinks
Products introduced in 1925
Relaxation drinks
Asahi Breweries